Cernusco-Merate railway station is a railway station in Italy. Located on the Lecco–Milan railway, it serves the towns of Cernusco Lombardone and Merate.

Services
Cernusco-Merate is served by the line S8 of the Milan suburban railway service, operated by the Lombard railway company Trenord.

See also
 Milan suburban railway service

Notes

External links

Railway stations in Lombardy
Milan S Lines stations
Railway stations opened in 1873